Robert Emmett Sweeney (born January 25, 1964) is an American former professional ice hockey center.

Career
Sweeney was born in Concord, Massachusetts, but grew up in Boxborough, Massachusetts. As a youth, he played in the 1976 Quebec International Pee-Wee Hockey Tournament with a minor ice hockey team from Assabet Valley. He was drafted out of high school by the Boston Bruins in the 1982 NHL Entry Draft, and went on to play four years at Boston College. He made his NHL debut in the 1986–87 season, but spent most of the year with the Bruins AHL affiliate the Moncton Golden Flames. The 1987–88 season was Sweeney's first full year, a season where Boston traveled to the Stanley Cup Finals only to be swept by the Edmonton Oilers.

Following six seasons with Boston, Sweeney was claimed off waivers by the Buffalo Sabres in 1992 and then by the New York Islanders in 1995. After being traded to the Calgary Flames during the 1995–96 season Sweeney retired from the NHL. He spent the next season in the IHL before traveling across the Atlantic to play in the Deutsche Eishockey Liga from 1997 until 2001.  He is currently the executive director of the Boston Bruins Foundation.

Awards and honors

Bob Sweeney Named Director of Development for the Boston Bruins Foundation - 2007

Personal
Bob Sweeney is the brother-in-law of Madeline Amy Sweeney, one of the flight attendants on American Airlines Flight 11, which hit the north tower of the World Trade Center during the September 11, 2001 attacks.

Career statistics

Regular season and playoffs

International

References

External links

1964 births
Living people
American men's ice hockey centers
Boston Bruins draft picks
Boston Bruins players
Boston College Eagles men's ice hockey players
Buffalo Sabres players
Calgary Flames players
Frankfurt Lions players
Ice hockey players from Massachusetts
Maine Mariners players
Moncton Golden Flames players
München Barons players
New York Islanders players
People from Middlesex County, Massachusetts
People from Concord, Massachusetts
Sportspeople from Middlesex County, Massachusetts
Quebec Rafales players
Revier Löwen players
AHCA Division I men's ice hockey All-Americans